The Compleat Gamester, first published in 1674, is one of the earliest known English-language games compendia. It was published anonymously, but later attributed to Charles Cotton (1630–1687). Further editions appeared in the period up to 1754 before it was eclipsed by Mr. Hoyle's Games by Edmond Hoyle (1672–1769).

History 

In the mid-17th century, game literature in England took off. Initially these were translations of French books, for example on Piquet, but later more original publications appeared. The most successful of these was The Compleat Gamester, which was first published anonymously in 1674, but was attributed during the 18th century to Charles Cotton. It included instructions on how to play billiards, trucks, bowls and chess, "together with all manner of usual and most gentile games either on cards or dice," as well as "the arts and mysteries" of riding, racing, archery and cock-fighting.

Editions 
Charles Cotton died in 1687, so subsequent editions were edited by other writers.

 1674: The Compleat Gamester. A.M, London. Charles Cotton.
 1676: The Compleat Gamester, 2nd edn. Charles Cotton.
 1709: The Compleat Gamester. Brome, London. Unknown editor.
 1721: The Complete Gamester. J. Wilford, London. Seymour
 1725: The Compleat Gamester, 5th edn with additions. J. Wilford, London. Unknown ed.
 1726: The Compleat Gamester, 6th edn with additions. Wilford, London. Unknown ed.
 1734: The Compleat Gamester, 5th edn. E. Curll / J. Wilford. London. Edited by Richard Seymour.
 1739: The Compleat Gamester, 6th edn. Curll/Hodges, London. Edited by Richard Seymour.
 1750: The Compleat Gamester, 7th edn. J. Hodges, London. Edited by Richard Seymour.
 1754: The Compleat Gamester, 8th edn. J. Hodges, London. Edited by Charles Johnson.

Footnotes

References

Literature 
 
 

English non-fiction books
17th-century books